This article contains a chronological summary of major events from the 2014 Winter Paralympics, which took place in Sochi, Russia.

All times are in Moscow Time (UTC+4).

Calendar

Day 1 − Friday 7 March
  Opening ceremony
 The opening ceremony took place at the Fisht Olympic Stadium. The ceremony included the lighting of the Paralympic Cauldron, as well as the athlete's parade. In response to Russia's military intervention, Ukraine only sent their flag bearer, Mykhaylo Thackenko, into the ceremony, with the others remaining outside in protest. There were huge cheers when Ukraine was announced, however.

Day 2 − Saturday 8 March
 Alpine skiing
 Women's downhill
 In the visually impaired event, Henrieta Farkasova and guide Natalia Subrtova (Slovakia) won the gold medal. Jade Etherington and guide Caroline Powell (Great Britain) finished second, and Russia's Aleksandra Frantceva and guide Pavel Zabotin finished third.
 In the standing event, Marie Bochet (France) recorded a time of 1:30.72 to win the gold medal. Inga Medvedeva (Russia) finished second, with Allison Jones (USA) in third.
 In the sitting event, Anna Schaffelhuber (Germany) recorded a time of 1:35.55 to finish with the gold medal. Alana Nichols (USA) finished just 0.14 seconds behind for silver, with Laurie Stephens (also USA) taking bronze.
 Men's downhill
 In the visually impaired event, Yon Santacana Maiztegui and guide Miguel Galindo Garces (Spain) finished with the gold medal. Miroslav Haraus and guide Maros Hudik (Slovakia) finished second, with Mac Marcoux and guide Robin Femy (Canada) third.
 In the standing event, Markus Salcher (Australia) took the gold medal, with Alexey Bugaev (Russia) in second. Vincent Gauthier-Manuel (France) finished third.
 In the sitting event, Akira Kano and Takeshi Suzuki (both Japan) won gold and bronze respectively. Josh Dueck (Canada) finished with the silver medal.

 Biathlon
 Women's 6km
 In the visually impaired event, Russia won both gold and silver medals, with Mikhalina Lysova and guide Alexey Ivanov first and Iuliia Budeleeva and guide Tatiana Malkseva second. Oksana Shyshkova and guide Lada Nesterenko (Ukraine) finished third.
 In the sitting event, Andrea Eskau (Germany) finished first with no misses, and a calculated time of 19:12.4. Russia's Svetlana Konovalova finished second, 18.7 seconds behind, and Olena Iurkovska (Ukraine) finished third.
 In the standing event, Russia took the gold and silver medals. Alena Kaufman finished first, with Anna Milenina second. Iuliia Betenkova (Ukraine) finished third.
 Men's 7.5km
 In the visually impaired event, Vitaliy Lukyanenko and guide Borys Babar (Ukraine) finished with gold medals. Nikolay Polukhin and guide Andrey Tokarev (Russia) finished second, with Vasili Shaptsiaboi and guide Mikhail Lebedzeu (Belarus) third.
 In the sitting event, Russian Roman Petushkov finished with no misses in first. Maksym Yarovyi (Ukraine) finished second and Kozo Kubo (Japan) third, both also with no misses.
 In the standing event, Canadian Mark Arendz finished second, 0.7 seconds behind Vladislav Lekomtcev (Russia), who won gold. The next three places were all filled by Russian athletes, with Azat Karachurin winning the bronze medal.

 Ice sledge hockey
 Preliminary round, Group A
  1-2 
  10-1 
Preliminary round, Group B
  5-1 
  2-3 

 Wheelchair curling
 Round robin, draw 1
  0-10 
  6-3 
  6-4 
  5-4 
 Round robin, draw 2
  3-7 
  7-6 
  5-9 
  5-4

Day 3 − Sunday 9 March
 Alpine skiing
 Men's Super-G
 In the visually impaired event, Jakub Krako and guide Martin Motyka (Slovakia) won the gold medal. Mark Bathum and guide Cade Yarmamoto (USA) finished second and Russia's Mac Marcoux and guide Robin Femy finished third.
 In the standing event, Markus Salcher and Matthias Lanzinger (both Austria) finished first and second respectively, with Alexey Bugaev (Russia) in third.
 In the sitting event, Japan's Akira Kano and Taiki Morii finished with the gold and silver medias, while Caleb Brousseau (Canada) finished third.

 Cross-country skiing
 In the men's 15km sitting event, Roman Petushkov (Russia) finished with the gold medal, Irek Zaripov (Russia) finished second and Aleksandr Davidovich (Russia) finished third.
 In the women's 12km sitting event, Lyudmyla Pavlenko (Ukraine) won gold, Oksana Masters (USA) won silver and Svetlana Konovalova (Russia) finished third.

 Ice sledge hockey
 Preliminary round, Group A
  2-1 
  4-0 
Preliminary round, Group B
  3-0 
  7-0 

 Wheelchair curling
 Round robin, draw 3
  4-6 
  8-5 
  3-8 
  4-7 
 Round robin, draw 4
  7-4 
  6-9 
  8-4

Day 4 − Monday 10 March
 Alpine skiing
 Women's Super-G
 In the visually impaired competition, Kelly Gallagher and guide Charlotte Evans (Great Britain) won gold with a time of 1:28.72. 0.22 seconds behind was Aleksandra Frantceva (Russia) with guide Pavel Zabotin. Jade Etherington and guide Caroline Powell (also Great Britain) finished third.
 In the sitting event, Anna Schaffelhuber (Germany) finished with the gold medal. Claudia Loesch (Austria) finished second, with Laurie Stephens (USA) third.
 In the standing event, Marie Bochet (France) won the gold medal, with Solène Jambaqué (also France) in second. Stephanie Jallen (USA) finished third.

 Cross-country skiing
 Men's 20km
 In the standing event, Russians Rushan Minnegulov and Vladislav Lekomtcev finished first and third respectively. Ilkka Tuomisto (Finland) finished second.
 In the visually impaired event, Brian McKeever and guide Graham Nishikawa (Canada) finished first, with Stanislav Chohlaev and guide Maksim Pirogov (Russia) second. Zebastian Modin and guide Albin Ackerot (Sweden) finished with the bronze medal.
 Women's 15km
 In the standing event, Helene Ripa (Canada) finished first, with Ukrainian Iuliia Batenkova second. Anna Milenina (Russia) finished third.
 In the visually impaired event, Elena Remizova and guide Natalia Yakimova (Russia) finished first, with Mikhalina Lysova and guide Alexey Ivanhov (also Russia) second. Yadviha Skorabahataya and guide Iryna Nafranovich (Belarus) finished third.

 Wheelchair curling
 Round robin, draw 5
  5-7 
  6-8 
  2-7 
  8-4 
 Round robin, draw 6
  2-12 
  2-11 
  6-8 
  6-5

Day 5 − Tuesday 11 March
 Alpine skiing
 Women's combined
 Visually impaired, standing and sitting
 Men's combined
 Visually impaired, standing and sitting

 Biathlon
 Men's 12.5km
 Visually impaired, standing and sitting
 Women's 10km
 Visually impaired, standing and sitting

 Ice sledge hockey
 Preliminary round, Group A
  2-0 
  1-0 
Preliminary round, Group B
  1-2 
  1-2 

 Wheelchair curling
 Round robin, draw 7
  7-4 
  6-8 
  2-7 
 Round robin, draw 8
  3-7 
  9-3 
  5-8 
  7-6

References

Summary
2014